A Dangerous Adventure may refer to:

 A Dangerous Adventure (serial), a Warner Bros. film serial
 A Dangerous Adventure (1937 film), a 1937 American film
 A Dangerous Adventure (1939 film), a 1939 Cuban film